Corbulamella is an extinct genus of bivalves in the family Corbulidae.

References

External links 
 
 

Corbulidae
Prehistoric bivalve genera